Eudendrium is a large genus of hydroids (Hydrozoa), one of two in the family Eudendriidae. These animals are marine cnidarias in the family Eudendriidae.

Species
Species so far described in this genus include:

 Eudendrium album Nutting, 1898
 Eudendrium angustum Warren, 1908
 Eudendrium annulatum Norman, 1864
 Eudendrium antarcticum Stechow, 1921
 Eudendrium arbuscula Wright, 1859
 Eudendrium armatum Tichomiroff, 1890
 Eudendrium armstongi Stechow, 1909
 Eudendrium attenuatum Allman, 1877
 Eudendrium aylingae Watson, 1985
 Eudendrium balei Watson, 1985
 Eudendrium bathyalis Marques & Calder, 2000
 Eudendrium bermudense Calder, 1988
 Eudendrium biseriale Fraser, 1935
 Eudendrium boreale Yamada, 1954
 Eudendrium breve Fraser, 1938
 Eudendrium calceolatum Motz-Kossowska, 1905
 Eudendrium californicum Torrey, 1902
 Eudendrium capillare Alder, 1856
 Eudendrium capillaroides Schuchert, 2008
 Eudendrium caraiuru Marques & Oliveira, 2003
 Eudendrium caricum Jäderholm, 1908
 Eudendrium carneum Clarke, 1882
 Eudendrium centicaule Fraser, 1938
 Eudendrium cingulatum Stimpson, 1854
 Eudendrium cnidoferum Stechow, 1919
 Eudendrium cochleatum Allman, 1877
 Eudendrium corrugatum Watson, 1985
 Eudendrium currumbense Watson, 1985
 Eudendrium cyathiferum Jäderholm, 1904
 Eudendrium deciduum Millard, 1957
 Eudendrium deforme Hartlaub, 1905
 Eudendrium dispar L. Agassiz, 1862
 Eudendrium distichum Clarke, 1879
 Eudendrium exiguum Allman, 1877
 Eudendrium eximium Allman, 1877
 Eudendrium fruticosum Allman, 1877
 Eudendrium garis Puce, Cerrano, Di Camillo, Bavestrello & Marques, 2006
 Eudendrium generale von Lendenfeld, 1885
 Eudendrium glomeratum Picard, 1952
 Eudendrium imperiale Yamada, 1954
 Eudendrium infundibuliforme Kirkpatrick, 1890
 Eudendrium irregulare Fraser, 1922
 Eudendrium jaederholmi Puce, Cerrano & Bavestrello, 2002
 Eudendrium japonicum Yamada, 1954
 Eudendrium kirkpatricki Watson, 1985
 Eudendrium klausi Puce, Cerrano, Marques & Bavestrello, 2005
 Eudendrium laxum Allman, 1877
 Eudendrium macquariensis Watson, 2003
 Eudendrium magnificum Yamada, 1954
 Eudendrium maldivense Borradaile, 1905
 Eudendrium maorianus Schuchert, 1996
 Eudendrium merulum Watson, 1985
 Eudendrium minutum  Watson, 1985
 Eudendrium moulouyensis Marques, Peña Cantero & Vervoort, 2000
 Eudendrium mucronatum Billiard, 1926
 Eudendrium nambuccense Watson, 1985
 Eudendrium nodosum Fraser, 1938
 Eudendrium novazealandiae Marktanner-Turneretscher, 1890
 Eudendrium parvum Warren, 1908
 Eudendrium pennycuikae Watson, 1985
 Eudendrium pocaruquarum Marques, 1995
 Eudendrium racemosum (Cavolini, 1785)
 Eudendrium rameum (Pallas, 1766)
 Eudendrium ramosum (Linnaeus, 1758)
 Eudendrium ritchiei Millard, 1975
 Eudendrium rugosum Fraser, 1940
 Eudendrium sagaminum Yamada, 1954
 Eudendrium scotti Puce, Cerrano & Bavestrello, 2002
 Eudendrium simplex Pieper, 1884
 Eudendrium speciosum Fraser, 1945
 Eudendrium terranovae Watson, 1895
 Eudendrium tottoni Stechow, 1932
 Eudendrium vaginatum Allman, 1863
 Eudendrium vervoorti Marques & Migotto, 1998

References

External links
 

 
Eudendriidae
Hydrozoan genera
Taxa named by Christian Gottfried Ehrenberg